Sisu (working title Immortal) is a 2022 Finnish historical action film written and directed by Jalmari Helander. Set in Finnish Lapland during World War II, the film follows a gold prospector who attempts to secure his gold from a Nazi death squad led by a brutal Schutzstaffel officer. The film stars Jorma Tommila, Aksel Hennie, Jack Doolan, and Mimosa Willamo. The film was shot in 2021 in Lapland.

Sony Pictures Worldwide Acquisitions acquired international distribution rights to the film, and Lionsgate acquired the rights in North America. The film debuted at the Midnight Madness section of the Toronto International Film Festival in September 2022. The film premiered in Finland on 27 January 2023, while in the United States, the film premieres on 28 April 2023.

Premise
In late 1944, during the Lapland War, gold prospector and Winter War veteran Aatami Korpi lives alone in the remote wilderness of Lapland, panning and mining in search of gold. Eventually, his efforts succeed when he uncovers a rich gold deposit. Collecting a hefty amount of gold nuggets, Aatami sets off to deliver his gold to the nearest town. Along the way, Aatami encounters a 30-man Wehrmacht platoon led by ruthless SS Obersturmführer Bruno Helldorf and his subordinate Wolf, who are destroying settlements in their retreat and have taken dozens of captives with them. Though Bruno and the platoon initially take little interest in Aatami, they change their mind upon learning of his gold, and attempt to seize it from him. But unbeknownst to them, Aatami was a skilled fighter during the Winter War nicknamed "The Immortal", and their attempts to capture Aatami and steal his gold result in brutal clashes.

Cast
 Jorma Tommila as Aatami Korpi
 Aksel Hennie as Bruno Helldorf
 Jack Doolan as Wolf
 Mimosa Willamo as Aino
 Onni Tommila as Schütze

Accolades 

|-
| align = "center" rowspan = "4" | 2022 || rowspan = "4" | 55th Sitges Film Festival || colspan = "2" | Best Film ||  || rowspan = "4" | 
|-
| Best Actor || Jorma Tommila || 
|-
| Best Cinematography || Kjell Lagerroos || 
|-
| Best Music || Juri Seppä, Tuomas Wäinölä || 
|}

References

External links
   (in Finnish)
 
 
 

2022 action films
Finnish action films
Finnish World War II films
Finnish multilingual films
Films about Nazis
Films about mining
Films set in Lapland
Films shot in Finland
Films directed by Jalmari Helander